Wilberforce College is a further education Sixth Form College in Hull, England.

External links
Official website

1988 establishments in England
Education in Kingston upon Hull
Educational institutions established in 1988
Sixth form colleges in the East Riding of Yorkshire